The following lists events that happened during  1961 in New Zealand.

Population
 Estimated population as of 31 December: 2,461,300
 Increase since 31 December 1960: 57,700 (2.40%)
 Males per 100 females: 101.2

Incumbents

Regal and viceregal
Head of State – Elizabeth II
Governor-General – The Viscount Cobham GCMG TD.

Government
Speaker of the House – Ronald Algie.
Prime Minister – Keith Holyoake
Deputy Prime Minister – Jack Marshall.
Minister of Finance – Harry Lake.
Minister of Foreign Affairs – Keith Holyoake.
Attorney-General – Ralph Hanan.
Chief Justice — Sir Harold Barrowclough

Parliamentary opposition 
 Leader of the Opposition –   Walter Nash (Labour)

Main centre leaders
Mayor of Auckland – Dove-Myer Robinson
Mayor of Hamilton – Denis Rogers
Mayor of Wellington – Frank Kitts
Mayor of Christchurch – George Manning
Mayor of Dunedin – Stuart Sidey

Events

January
The Ohakuri hydroelectric power plant starts operation.

February

March

April

June

July

August

September

October
 12 October Ten National MPs voted with the Opposition to remove capital punishment for murder from the Crimes Bill that the Second National Government had introduced, by a vote of 41 to 30.

November

December

Arts and literature
John Caselburg wins the Robert Burns Fellowship.

See 1961 in art, 1961 in literature

Music

See: 1961 in music

Radio and television
 Auckland television is extended to seven nights a week, two and a half hours a night. On 4 April, Auckland television went commercial. 
 Television transmission began in Christchurch (a year later than Auckland) on 1 June. Wellington followed four weeks later, on 1 July. 

See: 1961 in New Zealand television, 1961 in television, List of TVNZ television programming, Public broadcasting in New Zealand & :Category:Television in New Zealand.

Film

See: :Category:1961 film awards, 1961 in film, List of New Zealand feature films, Cinema of New Zealand, :Category:1961 films

Sport

Athletics
Barry Magee wins his first national title in the men's marathon, clocking 2:18:54.2 on 4 March in Christchurch.

Chess
 The 68th National Chess Championship was held in Auckland, and was won by Ortvin Sarapu of Auckland (his 6th title).

Cricket
 New Zealand tours South Africa (spanning December 1961 – February 1962) and drew the 5-Test series 2-2:
 8–12 December 1961, Durban: 1st Test. SA won by 30 runs (SA 292 + 149, NZ 245 and 166)
 26–29 December 1961, Johannesburg: 2nd Test Drawn (SA 322 + 178/6 decl, NZ 223 + 165/4)
 1–4 January 1962, Cape Town: 3rd Test. NZ won by 72 runs (NZ 385 + 212/9 decl., SA 190 + 335)
 2–5 February 1962, Johannesburg: 4th test. SA won by innings & 51 runs (NZ 164 + 249, SA 464)
 16–20 February 1962, Port Elizabeth: 5th Test: NZ won by 40 runs (NZ 275 + 228, SA 190 + 273)

Horse racing

Harness racing
 New Zealand Trotting Cup – Invicta
 Auckland Trotting Cup – Cardigan Bay

Lawn bowls
The national outdoor lawn bowls championships are held in Auckland.
 Men's singles champion – J.H. Rabone (Auckland Bowling Club)
 Men's pair champions – N. Posa, M. Vulinovich (skip) (Oratia Bowling Club)
 Men's fours champions – J. Hammersley, L.N. Harris, R.S. Eves, M.J. Squire (skip) (West End Bowling Club, New Plymouth)

Rugby union
 France tour New Zealand, losing all three Test matches:
 22 July, Eden Park, Auckland: New Zealand 13 – 6 France
 5 August, Athletic Park, Wellington: New Zealand 5 – 3 France
 19 August, lancaster Park, Christchurch: New Zealand 32 – 3 France

Soccer
 An English FA XI tours New Zealand, handing out two heavy defeats to the national men's team.
 5 June, Wellington: NZ 0 – 8 English FA XI
 10 June, Auckland: NZ 1 – 6 English FA XI
 The Chatham Cup was won by Dunedin team Northern who beat North Shore United 2 – 0 in the final.
 Provincial league champions:
	Auckland:	North Shore United
	Bay of Plenty:	Kawerau Town
	Buller:	Waimangaroa United
	Canterbury:	Technical OB
	Franklin:	Manurewa AFC
	Hawke's Bay:	Napier Rovers
	Manawatu:	Ohakea
	Marlborough:	Spartans
	Nelson:	Rangers
	Northland:	Kamo Swifts
	Otago:	Northern AFC
	Poverty Bay:	Eastern Union
	South Canterbury:	Thistle
	Southland:	Invercargill Thistle
	Taranaki:	Moturoa
	Waikato:	Hamilton Technical OB
	Wairarapa:	YMCA
	Wanganui:	New Settlers
	Wellington:	Northern
	West Coast:	Grey United

Births
 10 May: Blyth Tait, equestrian.
 26 June: David White, cricketer.
 9 August: John Key, politician, 38th Prime Minister of New Zealand (2008–2016)
 12 August: Mark Priest, cricketer.
 5 October: David Kirk, rugby player and business executive.
 5 October: Derek Stirling, cricketer.
 10 October: Gary Hurring, swimmer.
 31 October: Peter Jackson, filmmaker.
 15 November: Hugh McGahan, rugby league footballer.
 28 November: Bruce Derlin, tennis player.
 9 December: Ian Wright, rower.
 30 December: Bill English, politician, 39th Prime Minister of New Zealand (2016–2017)
 Michael Hight, painter.
 Willie Jackson, politician and broadcaster.
 Grant Lingard, artist.
 Anthony McCarten, playwright and novelist.
:Category:1961 births

Deaths
 25 June: Jack Lamason, cricketer.
 19 July: Mary Dreaver, politician.
 5 August: Sidney Holland, 25th Prime Minister of New Zealand.
 8 November: Frederick Vincent Ellis, artist.
 14 December: William Duncan, rugby union player.

References

See also
List of years in New Zealand
Timeline of New Zealand history
History of New Zealand
Military history of New Zealand
Timeline of the New Zealand environment
Timeline of New Zealand's links with Antarctica

 
1960s in New Zealand
Years of the 20th century in New Zealand
New Zealand
New Zealand